Henryk Marian Tomasik (born 4 January 1946) is the current bishop of Radom since his installation on 14 November 2009. He previously served as Auxiliary Bishop of Siedlce.

Tomasik was born in Łuków in the Diocese of Siedlce. After completing his studies at the Major Seminary in Siedlce, was ordained a priest 31 May 1969. He exercised his ministry as assistant pastor at Radoryż Kościelny from 1969-1971.
From 1971-1974 he studied at the Catholic University of Lublin, where he received his doctorate in Philosophy. From 1974 he was professor at the Major Seminary in Siedlce, where he taught ethics, theodicy, philosophy of religion and Catholic social teaching. He was also responsible for exercising for youth academic assistance and, since 1982, responsible for the diocesan campus ministry.

On 21 November 1992 he was appointed Titular Bishop of Minor Fornos and Auxiliary Bishop of Siedlce. On 6 January 1993, he received episcopal consecration from Pope John Paul II in Rome, and was appointed by the President of the Polish Bishops' Conference Commission for youth ministry. Since 1995 he is also executive officer of C.E.P. for World Youth Day. In close collaboration with the Pontifical Council for the Laity and local committees of the host countries, has drawn tens of thousands of young Poles to participate in every world meeting with the Pope and was invited by the Holy See as a catechist to all World Youth Days.

Currently with the Polish Episcopal Conference he holds the following positions: President of the Episcopal Council for the Pastoral Care of Youth and member of the Commission for Catholic Education, and member of the Councils: for Poles abroad for Migration, Tourism and Pilgrimages; for Family

He was appointed bishop of Radom appointment by Pope Benedict XVI on 16 October 2009, following the vacancy created by the appointment of Zygmunt Zimowski as president of the Pontifical Council for the Pastoral Care of Health Care Workers. He was installed at Radom on 14 November 2009.

References

Living people
1946 births
People from Łuków
21st-century Roman Catholic bishops in Poland
John Paul II Catholic University of Lublin alumni